Generations is an album by saxophonists Pepper Adams and Frank Foster which was recorded and released on the Muse label in 1985.

Reception 

The Allmusic review states "Baritonist Pepper Adams gets first billing on this record but he is actually only on four of the seven cuts. James L. Dean (who is heard on tenor, alto and clarinet) organized the session and it is largely his date despite the presence of Adams, tenor-saxophonist Frank Foster and a fine (if obscure) rhythm section. ... Overall the modern hard bop music is quite successful, but this album should have come out under Dean's name.".

Track listing 
All compositions by James L. Dean except where noted
 "Generations" – 7:42
 "Dance of Infidels" (Bud Powell) – 10:49
 "Stable Mates" (Benny Golson) – 5:15
 "Titter Pipes" (Tommy Newsom) – 5:30
 "Mood in Question" (Artie Shaw) – 4:20
 "Milestones" (Miles Davis) – 5:30
 "Inventory" – 5:45

Personnel 
Pepper Adams – baritone saxophone (tracks 1–4)
Frank Foster – tenor saxophone, soprano saxophone (tracks 1–3, 6 & 7)
James L. Dean – tenor saxophone, alto saxophone, clarinet
Vinnie Cutro – trumpet (track 1)
Noreen Grey – piano
Earl Sauls – bass (tracks 1–4, 6 & 7)
Glenn Davis – drums (tracks 1–4, 6 & 7)

References 

Pepper Adams albums
Frank Foster (musician) albums
1985 albums
Muse Records albums
Albums recorded at Van Gelder Studio
Collaborative albums